Chloanthes glandulosa is a species of flowering plant in the family Lamiaceae. It is a small shrub with wrinkled leaves and greenish-yellow tubular flowers. It is endemic to New South Wales.

Description
The leaf edges are minutely curved under, upper and lower surfaces have short, rigid bristles, upper surface wrinkled, lower surface with prominent veins. The lobes are narrowly egg-shaped, more or less scalloped with curved edges.

Taxonomy and naming
Chloanthes glandulosa was first formally described in 1810 by Robert Brown and the description was published in Prodromus florae Novae Hollandiae et insulae Van-Diemen, exhibens characteres plantarum quas annis 1802-1805. The specific epithet (glandulosa) means "gland bearing".

Distribution and habitat
This species grows in moist, mostly sandy soils in sclerophyll forests in the Blue Mountains from Springwood to Kurrajong.

References

glandulosa
Flora of New South Wales
Lamiales of Australia
Plants described in 1977